Sarina railway station is located on the North Coast line in Queensland, Australia. It serves the town of Sarina. Opposite the single platform lies a crossing loop and sidings for CSR's Plane Creek Mill ethanol distillery.

Services
Sarina is served by Traveltrain's Spirit of Queensland service.

References

External links

Sarina station Queensland's Railways on the Internet

Central Queensland
Regional railway stations in Queensland
North Coast railway line, Queensland
Sarina, Queensland